Wan Hu (万户 or 万虎) is a legendary Chinese official – supposedly having lived from as early as 2000 BCE to as late as the middle Ming dynasty (16th century) — who was described in 20th century sources as the world's first "astronaut" by having been lifted by rockets into outer space. The crater Wan-Hoo on the far side of the Moon is named after him.

The legend of Wan Hu

"Wang Tu"
A precursor of the story of Wan Hu appeared in an article by John Elfreth Watkins, published in the 2 October 1909 issue of Scientific American, which used the name Wang Tu instead of Wan Hu:
"Tradition asserts that the first to sacrifice himself to the problem of flying was Wang Tu, a Chinese mandarin of about 2,000 years B.C. Who, having had constructed a pair of large, parallel and horizontal kites, seated himself in a chair fixed between them while forty-seven attendants each with a candle ignited forty-seven rockets placed beneath the apparatus. But the rocket under the chair exploded, burning the mandarin and so angered the Emperor that he ordered a severe paddling for Wang."

The possibly farcical text proceeds to describe several other fictional stories of ancient aviators. A date of 2000 BCE pre-dates the emergence of writing in China by three or four centuries and pre-dates the invention of gunpowder-based rockets in China by about 3,000 years.

"Wan Hu"
The legend of "Wan Hu" was widely disseminated by an unreferenced account in Rockets and Jets by American author Herbert S. Zim in 1945. Another book from the same year, by George Edward Pendray, describes it as an "oft repeated tale of those early days." Most authorities consider the story apocryphal.
Early in the sixteenth century, Wan decided to take advantage of China's advanced rocket and fireworks technology to launch himself into outer space. He supposedly had a chair built with forty-seven rockets attached. On the day of lift-off, Wan, splendidly attired, climbed into his rocket chair and forty seven servants lit the fuses and then hastily ran for cover. There was a huge explosion. When the smoke cleared, Wan and the chair were gone, and was said never to have been seen again.

Popular culture

In a 2004 episode of the television series MythBusters, an attempt was made to recreate Wan Hu's flight using materials that would have been available to him. The chair exploded on the launch pad, with the crash test dummy showing what would be severe burns. An attempt was also made using a chair with modern rockets attached; however, the uncontrollable craft proved that there were far too many complications for such a thing to have succeeded. It was determined that small rockets that can be strapped to a chair cannot provide sufficient thrust to effectively lift it, giving the legend the label of myth "busted". The view the crew members had of the first test's performance matched what the legend said; after the smoke from the explosion had cleared, both the dummy and the chair had disappeared, though the dummy and the remains of the chair were found next to the "launch-pad".
In a show about inventions on Chinese Central Television called Tiān Gōng Kāi Wù (天工开物), Wan Hu was said to be able to lift himself by only about a foot (30 cm) using rockets. In most Chinese versions of Wan Hu's story, he is described as an unfortunate pioneer of space travel who was burnt to death because of the explosion caused by the rockets, instead of becoming the first astronaut in history.
In the BioWare game Jade Empire, the player can read about a character named "Cao Shong" who straps rockets to a chair in an effort to fly. The chair explodes, killing him.
 In the SCP Foundation mythos, SCP-1445 is the chair that Wan Hu used. In the 2000s, the 500-year-old chair, which still held Wan's frozen corpse, was recovered from low Earth orbit. The chair is made of Dalbergia odorifera wood, holds 22 rockets rather than 47, and is resistant to atmospheric drag but not micrometeoroid impacts. Wan was dressed in a Ming Dynasty-era hanfu and wushamao. An autopsy revealed that he had died from asphyxiation after the chair suddenly decelerated upon reaching low Earth orbit.
 In the Tokyo DisneySea attraction Soaring: Fantastic Flight a painting of the story of Wan Hu can be seen in the rotunda of the Museum of Fantastic Flight queue area alongside other paintings of legendary attempts at human flight.

See also
 Lagâri Hasan Çelebi
 Space exploration
 Larry Walters

References

External links 
 WAN HOO AND HIS SPACE VEHICLE
 NASA List of craters
 China's Ming Dynasty astronaut
  Ein Mandarin träumt von den Sternen

Inventors killed by their own invention
Ming dynasty scholars
People whose existence is disputed
Year of birth missing
Year of death missing
Rocket science pioneers
Chinese inventors
Legendary Chinese people
Homebuilt aircraft